Dandong railway station is a railway station located in Zhenxing District, Dandong, Liaoning, China. It is the terminus of the Shenyang–Dandong railway, the Dandong–Dalian intercity railway, and the Shenyang–Dandong intercity railway. It is also connected to the Pyongui Line which heads south to North Korea via the Sino-Korean Friendship Bridge.

References 
 

Railway stations in Liaoning